Bubble Ghost is an action video game originally created by Christophe Andréani for the Atari ST and published by ERE Informatique in 1987. The player controls a ghost who guides a floating bubble by blowing on it.

Gameplay
The objective is to guide a bubble throughout a number of halls in a haunted house. If the bubble hits any walls or obstacles, then it will pop and the player loses a life. Obstacles include lit candles, electricity and fans. These can be all controlled by the ghost, who can wander around the level freely and blow at things - such as the bubble to add speed, the candle to put out the flame, or switches to turn them on or off.

The ghost is controlled using the mouse. A press on the left button of the mouse makes the ghost rotate to the left. A press on the right button of the mouse makes the ghost rotate to the right. A press on a keyboard key (Shift) makes the ghost blow.

The game is made of 35 halls (levels). Each time the player makes the bubble exit a hall, he wins 1000 points + left bonus. Action on animation may add 5000 points to the player. The bonus is re-initialized at every new hall. A new bubble is added to the player account each time the bubble exits towards the top of the hall.

Ports
The original Bubble Ghost was created by Christophe Andréani (design, programming) on an Atari ST computer. The game has been adapted for other computers throughout the world.

Some years later, ERE Informatique was bought by Infogrames. Infogrames published a new version of Bubble Ghost with updated graphics, Bubble + (Bubble Plus).

A Game Boy version was published in 1990. It was the first French game adapted for the Game Boy.

Gallery

Development

The game was programmed in C (editor and compiler: Megamax C) and 68000 assembly language on an Atari 1040 ST computer. The graphics were made with the Degas Elite drawing software. The digital sound of the introductory page of the game ("Welcome to Bubble Ghost") was built using ST Replay. This is the author's voice. The other sound effects use the synthesizer inside the Atari ST.

Here are some notes from the author when creating the game:

Reception

The following French magazines have published Bubble Ghost review:
SVM Science et Vie Micro #45, December 1987 (Atari ST version) Download magazine
Tilt #49, December 1987 (Atari ST version) Download magazine
ST Magazine #14, November/December 1987 (Atari ST version) Download magazine
Micro News #6, November/December 1987 (Atari ST version)
Le Tatou #10, December 1987 (Atari ST version)
1ST (FirST) #4, December 1987 (Atari ST version) Download magazine
Jeux et Stratégie #48, December 1987 (Atari ST version)
Génération 4 #2, December 1987 (Atari ST version) Download magazine
Amstrad Cent Pour Cent #1, February 1988 (Amstrad CPC version) Download magazine
Tilt #52, March 1988 (Amstrad CPC version) Download magazine
Tilt #57, September 1988 (Amiga version) Download magazine
Génération 4 Hors série #2, oct/nov/dec 1990 (Game Boy version) Download magazine
Génération 4 #31, March 1991 (Game Boy version) Download magazine
Player One #18, March 1992 (Game Boy version) Download magazine
Joypad #7, April 1992 (Game Boy version) Download magazine
Consoles + #7, March 1992 (Game Boy version) Download magazine

Following US magazine has published Bubble Ghost review:
VideoGames and Computer Entertainment, USA, April 1991 (Game Boy version)
Antic Vol.7 #7, November 1988 (Atari ST version) See review
ST-Log Issue 24, October 1988 (Atari ST version) See review
ST-Log Issue 26, December 1988 (Atari ST version) See review

Following French magazines have published Bubble + (Bubble Plus) review:
Génération 4 #22, May 1990 (Atari ST and Amiga version) Download magazine
Micro News #35, May 1990 (Atari ST version) Download magazine
Tilt #79, June 1990 (Atari ST version) Download magazine

References

External links
Bubble Ghost at MobyGames
Bubble Ghost at Atari Mania
Bubble Ghost at Hall of Light

Christophe Andréani's website
Retro Decouverte author's interview

1987 video games
Accolade (company) games
Amiga games
Amstrad CPC games
Apple IIGS games
Atari ST games
Commodore 64 games
DOS games
Game Boy games
Video games about ghosts
Infogrames games
Multiplayer and single-player video games
Piko Interactive games
Pony Canyon games
Assembly language software
Video games scored by Hitoshi Sakimoto
Video games developed in France
Windows games